Middleton is a hamlet in the Blue Crane Route Local Municipality of the Sarah Baartman District Municipality in the Eastern Cape province of South Africa. Middleton is situated on the banks of the Fish River off the N10 road and is about 30 km south of Cookhouse.

History

Middleton was first established in 1850 as an Anglican mission station when the Anglican Church set aside glebe land to members of its congregation, many of whom were former slaves. In 1879 a train station was built in Middleton as a layover point between larger towns. This old train station has now been converted into a pub. The Noupoort Christian Care Center owns the hamlet of Middleton. This center runs a rehabilitation center for people suffering from substance addiction. The center provides recovering addicts with jobs in maintaining the grounds and establishments of Middleton.

Buildings
The most notable building in Middleton is the old train station, which has now been converted into a pub. The train station was built in 1879, and is the oldest standing building in the small hamlet. Another notable building is the All Saint's United Church, a stone church first built as an Anglican congregation in 1903. The architecture of the older buildings in Middleton is distinctly Victorian, especially the train station-turned-pub.

Attractions

The old station pub offers usual pub fare along with a play area and petting zoo for children. Next to the stone church is the Country Kitchen Padstal which serves locally made preserves and baked goods. Middleton also has B&B and camping facilities such as the Hunters Lodge and the B&B at the Manor.

Travellers consider Middleton a quaint stopover on their way to other attractions. The Addo Elephant and Shamwari national parks are less than an hour's drive south along the N10 highway from Middleton. Grahamatown is an hour's drive southeast. Two hours to the northeast are the towns Graaff-Reinet and Nieu-Bethesda, which are home to many attractions including the Camdeboo National Park, the Nieu-Bethesda Owl House, and the Kitching Fossil Exploration Centre. An hours drive to the south will take travellers to Port Elizabeth and on to the Garden Route on the south coast.

See also
 List of heritage sites in Graaff-Reinet
 George, Western Cape
 Knysna
 Plettenberg Bay
 Mossel Bay
 Bloukrans Bridge Bungy
 Tsitsikamma

References

External links

 Official website

Populated places in the Blue Crane Route Local Municipality
Populated places established in 1875
Karoo